The German Phytomedicine Society (German: Deutsche Phytomedizinische Gesellschaft e.V. - DPG) is the professional association of practitioners of phytomedicine, as successor to the Association of German Plant Physicians, which was based in Berlin from 1928 to 1937. The DPG was founded in 1949 in Fulda. The DPG headquarters is located in Braunschweig.

Mission and Aims 

The Association includes matters of:
Research, teaching and consultancy in the area of Phytomedicine  and disease  
Parasites, effects of weeds and growth problems of crop plants   
Measures for health maintenance in plants and practical application of this knowledge   
Exchange of information between practitioners of phytomedicine
National and international exchange of scientific and practical experience

The German Phytomedicine Society seeks to achieve this through the following activities:
Membership of the editorial board of the international Journal of Plant Diseases and Protection as the international scientific organ of the DPG
Organisation of and participation in meetings and colloquia such as the German Plant Protection Conference and the International DPG Berlin Symposium, inter- and trans-disciplinary DPG meetings as well as the 16 specialised working groups.
Fostering relations with organisations with related aims and between practitioners on a domestic and international basis
Membership of scientific societies and groups
Public relations work by means of presenting an objective and balanced picture of modern plant protection
Cooperating in the organisation of student curriculum and educational guidelines
Publication of the journal PHYTOMEDICINE for the DPG members
Publication of the series SPECTRUM PHYTOMEDIZIN for the expert public

The DPG is a member of the Board of Trustees for the award of the: 
Otto-Appel-Denkmünze (Otto Appel Memorial Medal) for valuable scientific or organisational contributions in the field of plant protection
 the Award of the Julius Kuehn Prize 
 the Anton de Bary Medal for exceptional contributions to the area of phytomedicine 
 the DPG Badge of Honour to deserving members.

Networking 
The Society is a member of: 
the Pflanzenschutzorganisation für Europa und den Mittelmeerraum (Organisation for Plant Protection in Europe and the Mediterranean)
the Deutschen Nationalkomitee Biologie (DNK), (German Nation Committee for Biology) that represents the interests of biological scientists in international organizations
 the International Association for the Plant Protection Sciences

The internet page of the society contains references to the international network of phytomedicine practitioners and to meetings of international working groups.

Notable members 
 Georg F. Backhaus
 Holger B. Deising
 Falko Feldmann
 Johannes Hallmann
 Johannes A. Jehle
 Manfred G. Raupp
 Kornelia Smalla
 Ralf T. Voegele

External links 
German Phytomedicine Society
History of the DPG in German

References 

Agricultural organisations based in Germany
Scientific organizations established in 1928
Scientific organisations based in Germany
Organisations based in Braunschweig
1949 establishments in Germany
Conservation and environmental foundations
Foundations based in Germany